The Erasmus Prize is an annual prize awarded by the board of the Praemium Erasmianum Foundation to individuals or institutions that have made exceptional contributions to culture, society, or social science in Europe and the rest of the world. It  is one of Europe's most distinguished recognitions. The prize is named after Desiderius Erasmus, the Dutch Renaissance humanist.

Prize and adornment
, the prize consists of €150,000 and an adornment that was designed by Bruno Ninaber van Eyben in 1995. The adornment is a ribbon folded in the style of a harmonica, with ends made of titanium plates. The ribbon bears a text in the handwriting of Erasmus taken from a letter to Jean Carondelet written on 5 January 1523. The text reads "variae sunt ingeniorum dotes multae seculorum varietates sunt. quod quisque potest in medium proferat nec alteri quisquam invideat qui pro sua virili suoque modo conatur publicis studiis utilitatis aliquid adiungere.", which translates as "Diverse are the gifts of men of genius and many are the different kinds of ages. Let each one reveal the scope of his competence and let no one be envious of another who in keeping with his own ability and style tries to make a useful contribution to the education of all."

Ceremony
The award ceremony typically takes place at the Royal Palace of Amsterdam, where the prize is presented by the patron of the Foundation (King Willem-Alexander of the Netherlands ). A wide range of academic and cultural activities are organised around the Erasmus Prize award ceremony, in cooperation with other academic and cultural organisations. These have included lectures, conferences, workshops, exhibitions, performances of dance, music and theatre, and other educational activities. An essay on the topic of the laureate and their work is also published.

The prize was first awarded in 1958.  it has been awarded a total of 73 times in 53 years. The area in which the Erasmus prize will be awarded is decided upon in advance by the Foundation's board. An advisory committee then consults with Dutch and foreign experts before proposing a laureate; the final choice of the laureate is then made by the Foundation's board.

Young researchers
The Erasmus prize is not intended to stimulate young researchers. However, the Praemium Erasmianum Foundation has awarded from 1988 yearly "studyprizes" for exceptionally high quality PhD studies on the field of humanities or social sciences.

Prize winners

See also

 List of awards for contributions to culture
 List of awards for contributions to society

References

External links

 

Annual events
Awards established in 1958
Awards for contributions to culture
Prize
Dutch awards
Awards for contributions to society